William Self may refer to:
 Will Self (born 1961), English novelist
 William Self (organist) (1906–1998), American organist and choirmaster
 William Edwin Self, American actor and producer
 William Lee Self, American musician and composer
 Bill Self (born 1962), American basketball coach